"The Bridge" was a #1 chart hit in 1981 for New Zealand singer Deane Waretini, and his backing group The Rising Stars. This also marked a first. It was the first Maori language record to hit the no 1 spot in New Zealand. "The Bridge" is an example of an artist in the 1980s contributing to the success of a record. This was done by kick starting the process in the beginning by self-financing the record, having a hand in its own promotion by employing various tactics to get the record heard by the public.

Background
It was sung in Māori language, and set to Nini Rosso's tune "Il Silenzio". The words were written Waretini's cousin, George Tait, a Te Arawa elder. It pushed John Lennon off the charts when it climbed to the top.

The Bridge was originally independently and self-released. It wasn't picked up CBS until later. After that it became the first no 1 song to be sung in the Maori language. It stayed at the top of the charts for two weeks.

The song has a meaning to it. It centers around the construction of the Mangere Bridge. The song's lyrics refer to the linking of two cultures in New Zealand, Māori and Pakeha.

Making the record

Recording
It was recorded in Auckland in the suburb of Henderson. The session took place in a garage studio that belonged to a country singer. The ensemble that backed him on the recording included musicians from the Blind Institute. According to Alan Perrotts article, "You must remember this" in  the March 30, 2009 edition of The New Zealand Herald, the group that backed Waretini, referred to there as The Rising Suns, was formerly called The Radars. The trumpet player on the song who happened to be married to the niece of George Tait was Kevin Furey formerly of the Quincy Conserve.  Waretini didn't have money to pay the musicians so he paid them in Kentucky Fried Chicken.

Production & promotion
His use of a  tactic first employed by Gary Havoc & The Hurricanes of self-financing a record,<ref>Stranded in Paradise: New Zealand Rock'n'Roll, 1955-1988, by John Dix, Page  219, Page 294</ref> Waretini paid for his own record. He had a pile of the singles produced, which cost him $96. Some singles were sent to Radio 1ZB. Waretini then bombarded them with play requests. He also managed to get it played at intermission time at Auckland's Civic Theatre. Another tactic was recruiting a news paper boy to sell copies to passing people for 50 cents a piece. (His backing band, The Rising Stars,45cat Artist: Deane Waretini With The Rising Stars, Catalogue: INN 009 two years later in 1983 would use the same approach to getting the single out there.)  The single which was produced by Allan Witana, and originally released on the Innovations label.  A short time later, people going into record shops looking for "The Bridge". Not long afterwards, CBS wanted to put it out. On the third of April 1981, the song went to no 1, pushing John Lennon's "Woman" from the top spot it previously held. It also reached no 7 in Australia.

For his part, Warentini he received $27,000 from CBS and also gave up his rights to the song.

Other versions

Alternative version
There is an Unreleased Alternative Version by Waretini that appears on the Waiata Maori Showbands, Balladeers & Pop Stars'', various artists compilation that was released by His Master's Voice and EMI in 2011.

Parody version
In 1981, the song became victim to a parody by Kevin Blackatini and the Frigids, and a record was released on the RTC label. Kevin Blackatini was actually Radio Hauraki DJ, Kevin Black.

Chart progress

Releases

References

1981 singles
Number-one singles in New Zealand
Deane Waretini songs
Māori-language songs
1981 songs